Ahmed Shah or Ahmad Shah is the name of:

Kings
Shamsuddin Ahmad Shah (r. 1433–1435), Sultan of Bengal
Ahmad Shah Durrani (r. 1722–1772), founder of the Durrani dynasty and also known as Ahmad Shah Abdali
Ahmad Shah Bahadur (r. 1748–1775), a Mughal emperor of northern India
Ahmad Shah Qajar (r. 1898–1930), last ruler of Iran's Qajar dynasty
Ahmad Shah (Sultan of Malacca)

Rulers of Pahang
Ahmad Shah I of Pahang (r. 1475–1495)
Ahmad Shah II of Pahang (r. 1590–1592)
Ahmad Shah of Pahang (r. 1974–2019), 5th Sultan of modern Pahang and one of the heads-of-state of Malaysia

Rulers of Gujarat Sultanate during the rule of Muzaffarid dynasty were named Ahmad Shah
Ahmad Shah I (1411-1442) who founded Ahmedabad, India
Ahmad Shah II (1451-1458)
Ahmad Shah III (1554-1567)

Other individuals
Ahmad Shah (Taliban) (nom de guerre Mohammad Ismail, died 2008), Taliban leader in northeastern Afghanistan; the focus of Operation Red Wings
Ahmad Shah Khan, claimant to the abolished throne of Afghanistan
Ahmad Shah Massoud (1953–2001), leader of the Afghan Northern Alliance
Ahmed Shah (Afghan cricketer) born 1983, Afghan cricketer
Ahmed Shah (Indian cricketer) born 1995, Indian cricketer

See also
 Malik Ahmad Nizam Shah I (reigned 1480–1509, died 1510), Nizam of Ahmadnagar